Aase Lundsteen (15 July 1903 – 8 May 1984) was a Danish painter. Her work was part of the painting event in the art competition at the 1924 Summer Olympics.

References

1903 births
1984 deaths
20th-century Danish painters
Danish women painters
Olympic competitors in art competitions
People from Copenhagen